This is a list of Spanish television related events from 1957.

Events
 13 January: First Theatre Play in Spanish television is broadcast live: Before Beakfast (Eugene O'Neill), directed by Juan Guerrero Zamora and starred by Maruchi Fresno.
 22 April – José M. Revuelta is appointed by the Government Director General of Radio and Television.
 September – First Talk show in Televisión Española: Tele-Madrid, hosted by Tico Medina and Yale.
 15 September – Telediario, the longest-running News program in Spanish television debuts on TVE.

Debuts

Ending this year
 Desde mi butaca. (1956–1957)
 Imagen de una vida. (1956–1957)

Foreign series debuts in Spain 
 Patrulla de tráfico (Highway Patrol)

Births
 18 January – Marián Flores, hostess (Un, dos, tres...responda otra vez).
 15 February – Jordi Rebellón, actor.
 2 March – Virginia Mataix, actress
 11 March – Isabel Ordaz, actress. (Aquí no hay quien viva, la que se avecina).
 23 March – Nieves Herrero, hostess.
 7 April – Mariano Peña, actor. (Aída)
 22 May – Enrique del Pozo, Singer and host.
 27 May – Iñaki Miramón, actor.
 15 June – Iñaki Cano, sports journalist.
 8 July – Carlos Herrera, journalist.
 9 August – Juan José Guerenabarrena, host.
 14 August – José Coronado, actor. (Periodistas)
 19 August – Gracia Olayo, actress.
 16 September – Assumpta Serna, actress. (Falcon Crest)
 19 September – Pepe Carrol, presenter
 9 December – José Luis Gil, actor. (Aquí no hay quien viva, la que se avecina).
 15 December – Luis Fernández Fernández, President of RTVE.
 25 December – Elena Sánchez, journalist.
 Juan Ramón Sánchez, actor (Barrio Sésamo).

See also
1957 in Spain
List of Spanish films of 1957

References